514 Armida is a minor planet orbiting the Sun. According to the Catalogue of Minor Planet Names and Discovery Circumstances, it is "named for the beautiful legendary sorceress in Torquato Tasso’s (1544–1595) Jerusalem Delivered. She is the leading character in the opera Armida  (composed 1777) by Christoph Willibald Gluck (1714–1787)." (Numerous other composers have written "Armida" operas; see Armida.)

References

External links 
 Lightcurve plot of (514) Armida, Antelope Hills Observatory
 
 

000514
Discoveries by Max Wolf
Named minor planets
000514
19030824